Branko Mikša (born 13 February 1947) is a Croatian retired politician. He was Minister of Trade (1992), Minister of Tourism and Trade (1992–93), and later Mayor of Zagreb from April 1993 to March 1996, following the 1993 local election.

During his tenure as mayor, the Importanne Center and a Sheraton hotel in Zagreb were built, and the Ante Starčević, Petar Preradović and King Tomislav Squares in Donji Grad were renovated. Medvedgrad, an old fortress near Sljeme, underwent renovation at that time.

Between 1997 and 1998, Mikša was the president of the Croatian Football Federation.

References 

1947 births
Living people
Faculty of Economics and Business, University of Zagreb alumni
Croatian Democratic Union politicians
Government ministers of Croatia
Mayors of Zagreb
Presidents of the Croatian Football Federation
Tourism ministers of Croatia